Disa Park is one of the best-known pieces of architecture in  the Vredehoek area of Cape Town, South Africa.

Overview 
Built by the construction company Murray & Roberts in the 1960s, these three 17 story, cylindrical towers, called Blinkwater, Platteklip and Silverstroom, are nestled on the slopes of Table Mountain, and are almost universally proclaimed to be a blemish on the face of the majestic mountain. The three towers are popularly known to Capetonians as "The Pepper Pots", "Toilet Rolls" and "Tampon Towers". It has 287 apartment units providing enough housing for roughly 1,000 residents.

Murray & Roberts found a loop hole in the building restrictions on the mountainside, and built the base below the allowable development line, then built upward, above the line.

The residents tend to disagree with the demolitionists; their homes have access to dozens of trails and hikes on their doorstep as well as a tennis court, squash courts, braai area and a swimming pool. The towers also provide an excellent vantage point for scenic views over the region, but dominate views of Table Mountain from below.

Gallery

See also
 Lion's Head
 Signal Hill
 Disa uniflora

References

External links
 Panoramic view showing the three towers

Towers in South Africa
Buildings and structures in Cape Town